is a passenger railway station located in the city of Katori, Chiba Prefecture, Japan operated by the East Japan Railway Company (JR East).

Lines
Jūnikyō Station is served by the Kashima Line, and is located 3.0 km from the official starting point of the line at Katori Station.

Station layout
The station consists of one elevated side platform with a weather shelter, but no station building. The platform is short and can accommodate trains of up to six carriages. The station is unattended.

History
Jūnikyō Station was opened on August 20, 1970, as a passenger station on the Japan National Railways (JNR). The station was absorbed into the JR East network upon the privatization of the Japan National Railways (JNR) on April 1, 1987.

Surrounding area
Suigō Sawara Aquatic Botanical Garden

See also
 List of railway stations in Japan

External links

JR East station information 

Railway stations in Japan opened in 1970
Railway stations in Chiba Prefecture
Katori, Chiba